William Alfred Ernest Homan (25 December 1880 – 1 May 1963) was an Australian rules footballer who played with Collingwood and Melbourne in the Victorian Football League (VFL).

Notes

External links 

1880 births
1963 deaths
Australian rules footballers from Victoria (Australia)
Collingwood Football Club players
Melbourne Football Club players